The Peel Sessions is a compilation album by the German experimental rock band Can. Released in November 1995, it contains songs from four sessions recorded for John Peel's Radio 1 show. The sessions took place in February 1973 (track 1), January 1974 (track 4), October 1974 (tracks 2 & 3), and May 1975 (tracks 5 & 6). The songs are mostly unreleased improvisations. "Geheim" is released as "Half Past One" on Landed and "Mighty Girl" as "November" on Out of Reach.

Track listing 
All tracks composed by Holger Czukay, Michael Karoli, Jaki Liebezeit, Irmin Schmidt and Damo Suzuki.
"Up the Bakerloo Line with Anne" – 18:49
"Return to BB City" – 8:27
"Tape Kebab" – 8:58
"Tony Wanna Go" – 14:31
"Geheim (Half Past One)" – 6:42
"Mighty Girl" – 8:41

Personnel
Can
Holger Czukay – bass guitar
Michael Karoli – guitar
Jaki Liebezeit – drums
Irmin Schmidt – keyboards
Damo Suzuki – vocals

References

External links
 
 The Peel Sessions at CAN discography

1995 compilation albums
1995 live albums
Can (band) albums
Can